暨南大學 may refer to:
Jinan University, a university in Guangzhou, China
National Chi Nan University,, a university in Nantou, Taiwan